Sergey Mindirgasov (born 14 November 1959) is a Soviet fencer. He won a silver medal in the team sabre event at the 1988 Summer Olympics.

References

External links
 

1959 births
Living people
Ukrainian male sabre fencers
Soviet male sabre fencers
Olympic fencers of the Soviet Union
Fencers at the 1988 Summer Olympics
Olympic silver medalists for the Soviet Union
Olympic medalists in fencing
Medalists at the 1988 Summer Olympics
Universiade medalists in fencing
Universiade gold medalists for the Soviet Union
Medalists at the 1985 Summer Universiade
Sportspeople from Luhansk